Rosemary Stevenson (June 2, 1936 – January 3, 2017) was an American outfielder who played in the All-American Girls Professional Baseball League in its final season of operation (1954). She batted left handed and threw right handed.

Early life
She was born June 2, 1936, in Stalwart, Michigan.

Baseball career
She played softball starting at age 11. As a 17-year-old student at Pickford High School, located in Pickford Township, Michigan, she heard about the AAGPBL and tried out. In 1954, she was assigned to the Grand Rapids Chicks, based in Grand Rapids, Michigan, playing her first game the day after her high school graduation. She played in 54 games, until the league folded later that year. She went on to play and coach softball.

In her later years Rosemary wrote an autobiography titled "Don't Die on Third".

She died January 3, 2017 in Nunica, Michigan.

Career statistics

See also

 List of All-American Girls Professional Baseball League players
 List of people from Grand Rapids, Michigan

References

1936 births
2017 deaths
All-American Girls Professional Baseball League players
Baseball players from Grand Rapids, Michigan
Baseball outfielders
People from Chippewa County, Michigan
Writers from Michigan
21st-century American women